Petros II may refer to:

 Pope Peter II of Alexandria, ruled in 373–381
 Petros II, Caucasian Albanian Catholicos whose rule ended c. 1331
 Jacob Petros II Hovsepian, ruled in 1749–1753